The third series of the British children's television series The Story of Tracy Beaker began broadcasting on 25 September 2003 on CBBC and ended on 1 April 2004. The series follows the lives of the children living in the fictional children's care home of Stowey House, nicknamed by them "The Dumping Ground". It consists of twenty-six, fifteen-minute episodes. It is the third series in The Story of Tracy Beaker franchise.

Cast

Dani Harmer (Tracy Beaker), Montanna Thompson (Justine Littlewood), Nisha Nayar (Elaine Boyak), Clive Rowe (Duke Ellington), Lisa Coleman (Cam Lawson), Ciaran Joyce, Ben Hanson, Chloe Hibbert-Waters and James Cartwright all returned to their main roles. Stephen Crossley and Caroline Bunce returned to their guest starring role as Justine's father, Steve Littlewood and his wife, Carrie respectively. Adele Azupadi (Rochelle Gadd), Amber Hearst (Alicia Hooper), Ben Batambuze (Luke Youngblood) & Jenny Edwards (Sharlene White) did not return for this series. Padley, who left the main cast last series, made seven guest appearances. Jack Edwards, Kristal Lau, William Tomlin, Darragh Mortell, Abby Rakic-Platt, Nicola Reynolds and Cara Readle all made their debuts as main characters, Marco Maloney, Hayley, Michael Grice, Liam "Crash" Daniels, Jackie Hopper, Shelly Appleton and Layla respectively. Howell Evans began appearing as a guest character and Jackie's grandfather, Jack and Oliver Llewellyn Jenkins appeared as Wilson for two episodes. This was the last series to feature Cartwright, Padley, Tomlin and Hibbert-Waters. Thompson left her main cast role, but made a guest appearance in series four and a main cast return in the final series. Reynolds also left her main cast role, but returned in the final series. Crossley and Bunce left their guest starring roles, but the characters, Steve and Carrie, returned in the final series, played by Morgan Hopkins and Kathryn Dimery.

Main

Guest

Episodes

Production
Cas Lester left the production team after the previous series and was replaced by the former producer, Jane Dauncey. Dauncey was then replaced by Mia Jupp. Filming took place after series two had aired, in 2003. The series 2 directors, Delyth Thomas and Joss Agnew, returned, but were joined by Laurence Wilson. Thomas directed eight episodes, Agnew directed ten episodes and Wilson directed seven episodes. Mary Morris is head writer of this series. Ian Carrey, Rob Gittins, Lucy Flannery and writing duo, Sam Bain & Jesse Armstrong did not return to write any episodes of series 3. They were replaced by Dan Anthony, Simon Nicholson, Holly Lyons, Marvin Close and Ariane Sherine. Returning from writing episodes of series 1 and series 2 are Morris, Laura Summers, Othniel Smith and Andy Walker while returning from writing episodes of only series 2 are Gary Parker, Abigal Abben-Mensah and Tracy Brabin. Morris wrote five episodes; Summers and Parker wrote four episodes each; Smith, Anthony, Lyons and Close wrote two episodes each; and Nicholson, Mensah, Walker, Brabin and Sherine wrote one episode each.

Awards and nominations

Ratings

References

The Story of Tracy Beaker
2003 British television seasons
2004 British television seasons